Percy Greg (7 January 1836 Bury – 24 December 1889, Chelsea), son of William Rathbone Greg, was an English writer.

Percy Greg, like his father, wrote about politics, but his views were violently reactionary: his History of the United States to the Reconstruction of the Union (1887) can be said to be more of a polemic, rather than a history.

His Across the Zodiac (1880) is an early science fiction novel, said to be the progenitor of the sword-and-planet genre. For that novel, Greg created what may have been the first artistic language that was described with linguistic and grammatical terminology. It also contained what is possibly the first instance in the English language of the word "astronaut".

In 2010 a crater on Mars was named Greg in recognition of his contribution to the lore of Mars.

Bibliography

Across the Zodiac (1880)
History of the United States to the Reconstruction of the Union (1887)

References

External links 
 
 

1836 births
1889 deaths
People from Bury, Greater Manchester